The Awan Dynasty (Sumerian:  lugal-e-ne a-wa-anki, "Kings of Awan") was the first dynasty of Elam of which very little of anything is known today, appearing at the dawn of historical record. The Dynasty corresponds to the early part of the Old Elamite period (dated c. 2700 – c. 1600 BC), it was succeeded by the Shimashki Dynasty (2200-1900 BC) and later the Sukkalmah Dynasty. The Elamites were likely major rivals of neighboring Sumer from remotest antiquity; they were said to have been defeated by Enmebaragesi of Kish (c. 25th century BC), who is the earliest archaeologically attested Sumerian king, as well as by a later monarch, Eannatum I of Lagash.

Awan was a city-state or possibly a region of Elam whose precise location is not certain, but it has been variously conjectured to be north of Susa, in south Luristan, close to Dezful, or Godin Tepe.

Elam and Sumer
According to the Sumerian King List, a dynasty from Awan exerted hegemony in Sumer after defeating the First Dynasty of Ur, probably in the 25th century BCE. It mentions three Awan kings, who supposedly reigned for a total of 356 years. Their names have not survived on the extant copies, apart from the partial name of the third king, "Ku-ul...", who it says ruled for 36 years. This information is not considered reliable, but it does suggest that Awan had political importance in the 3rd millennium BC.

A royal list found at Susa gives 12 names of the kings in the Awan dynasty. The twelve kings of Awan given in the list are: Pieli, Tari/ip, Ukkutahieš, Hišur, Šušuntarana, Na-?-pilhuš, Kikkutanteimti, Luhhiššan, Hišepratep, Hielu?, Hita-Idaddu-napir, Puzur-Inšušinak. The twelve kings of the Shimashki Dynasty are: Girnamme, Tazitta, Ebarti, Tazitta, Lu?-x-luuhhan, Kindattu, Idaddu, Tan-Ruhurater, Ebarti, Idaddu, Idaddu-Temti.

As there are very few other sources for this period, most of these names are not certain. Little more of these kings' reigns is known, but Elam seems to have kept up a heavy trade with the Sumerian city-states during this time, importing mainly foods, and exporting cattle, wool, slaves and silver, among other things.  A text of the time refers to a shipment of tin to the governor of the Elamite city of Urua, which was committed to work the material and return it in the form of bronze — perhaps indicating a technological edge enjoyed by the Elamites over the Sumerians.

It is also known that the Awan kings carried out incursions in Mesopotamia, where they ran up against the most powerful city-states of this period, Kish and Lagash. One such incident is recorded in a tablet addressed to Enetarzi, a minor ruler or governor of Lagash, testifying that a party of 600 Elamites had been intercepted and defeated while attempting to abscond from the port with plunder.

Events become a little clearer at the time of the Akkadian Empire (c. 2300 BC), when historical texts tell of campaigns carried out by the kings of Akkad on the Iranian plateau. Sargon of Akkad boasted of defeating a "Luh-ishan king of Elam, son of Hishiprashini", and mentions plunder seized from Awan, among other places. Luhi-ishan is the eighth king on the Awan king list, while his father's name "Hishiprashini" is a variant of that of the ninth listed king, Hishepratep - indicating either a different individual, or if the same, that the order of kings on the Awan king list has been jumbled.

Sargon's son and successor, Rimush, is said to have conquered Elam, defeating its king who is named as Emahsini. Emahsini's name does not appear on the Awan king list, but the Rimush inscriptions claim that the combined forces of Elam and Warahshe, led by General Sidgau, were defeated at a battle "on the middle river between Awan and Susa".  Scholars have adduced a number of such clues that Awan and Susa were probably adjoining territories.

With these defeats, the low-lying, westerly parts of Elam became a vassal of Akkad, centred at Susa. This is confirmed by a document of great historical value, a peace treaty signed between Naram-Sin of Akkad and an unnamed king or governor of Awan, probably Khita or Helu. It is the oldest document written in Elamite cuneiform that has been found.

Although Awan was defeated, the Elamites were able to avoid total assimilation. The capital of Anshan, located in a steep and mountainous area, was never reached by Akkad. The Elamites remained a major source of tension, that would contribute to destabilizing the Akkadian state, until it finally collapsed under Gutian pressure.

Reign of Kutik-Inshushinak, the height of Awan

When the Akkadian empire started to break down around 2240 BC, it was Kutik-Inshushinak (or Puzur-Inshushinak), the governor of Susa on behalf of Akkad, who liberated Awan and Elam, ascending to the throne.

By this time, Susa had started to gain influence in Elam (later, Elam would be called Susiana), and the city began to be filled with temples and monuments. Kutik-Inshushinak next defeated Kimash and Hurtum (neighboring towns rebelling against him), destroying 70 cities in a day. Next he established his position as king, defeating all his rivals and taking Anshan, the capital. Not content with this, he launched a campaign of devastation throughout northern Sumer, seizing such important cities as Eshnunna. When he finally conquered Akkad he was declared king of the four quarters, owner of the known world. Later, Ur-Nammu of Ur, founder of the 3rd dynasty of Ur defeated Elam, ending the dynasty of Awan.

Kutik-Inshushinak's work was not only as a conqueror; he created Elam's organization and the administrative structure. He extended the temple of Inshushinak, where he erected a statue of her.

After his defeat, the Awan dynasty disappears from history, probably cut down by the Guti or Lullubi tribes that then sowed disorder in Mesopotamia and the Zagros, and Elam was left in the hands of the Shimashki dynasty.

Awan and Anshan?

The toponym "Awan" only occurs once more following the reign of Kutik-Inshushinak, in a year-name of Ibbi-Sin of Ur.  The name Anshan, on the other hand, which only occurs once before this time (in an inscription of Manishtushu), becomes increasingly more commonplace beginning with king Gudea of Lagash, who claimed to have conquered it around the same time.  It has accordingly been conjectured that Anshan not only replaced Awan as one of the major divisions of Elam, but that it also included the same territory.

Awan king list
Peli or Feyli
Tata
Ukku-Tanhish
Hishutash
Shushun-Tarana
Napi-Ilhush
Kikku-Siwe-Temti
Luhi-ishshan (contemporary with Sargon of Akkad)
Hishep-Ratep
Helu
Khita
Puzur-Inshushinak, (contemporary with Ur-Nammu)

"Twelve kings of Awan."

Elamite Governors of Susa under Akkadian rule
Sanam-Shimut (until c. 2325 BC)
Zinuba (until c. 2315 BC)
Epirmupi (from c. 2315 BC)
Lamgium (contemporary with Manishtusu king of Akkad)
Eshpum (contemporary with Manishtusu king of Akkad)
Uba (cont. with Manishtusu king of Akkad)
Enammuna (contemporary with Naram-Sin king of Akkad)
Ur-Ili-Adad
Ilishmani
Shinpi-hish-huk
Kutik-Inshushinak

References

Bibliography

 Cameron, George, "History of Early Iran", Chicago, 1936 (repr., Chicago, 1969; tr. E.-J. Levin, L’histoire de l’Iran antique, Paris, 1937; tr. H. Anusheh, ایران در سپیده دم تاریخ, Tehran, 1993)
 D’yakonov, I. M., "Istoriya Midii ot drevenĭshikh vremen do kontsa IV beka do e.E" (The history of Media from ancient times to the end of the 4th century BCE; Дьяконов И. М. "История Мидии от древнейших времён до конца IV века до н. э."), Moscow and Leningrad, 1956; tr. Karim Kešāvarz as Tāriḵ-e Mād, Tehran, 1966.
 Hinz, W., "The Lost World of Elam", London, 1972 (tr. F. Firuznia, دنیای گمشده ایلام, Tehran, 1992)
 Legrain, Leon, "Historical Fragments", Philadelphia, The University of Pennsylvania Museum Publications of the Babylonian Section, vol. XIII, 1922.
 Majidzadeh, Yusef, "History and civilization of Elam", Tehran, Iran University Press, 1991.
 Majidzadeh, Yusef, "History and civilization of Mesopotamia", Tehran, Iran University Press, 1997, vol.1.
 The Cambridge Ancient History
 The Cambridge History of Iran
 Last update : 13 December 2011. Substantial bibliography

27th-century BC establishments
22nd-century BC disestablishments
Elamite kings